The 1968 United States presidential election in Michigan was held on November 5, 1968. All 50 states and The District of Columbia, were part of the 1968 United States presidential election. Votes chose 21 electors to represent them in the Electoral College, who voted for president and vice president.

Michigan was won by the Democratic Party candidate, Vice President Hubert Humphrey, defeating the Republican Party candidate, former Vice President Richard Nixon, by a margin of 6.72%, making the state 6.79% more Democratic than the national average. American Independent Party candidate, former Alabama governor George Wallace, performed rather well, receiving 10% of the vote.

Humphrey's margin of victory was significantly down from President Lyndon B. Johnson's landslide 33.6 point triumph in 1964. American involvement in the Vietnam War, plus race riots in Detroit and the rest of the country, brought about unpopularity for the incumbent president and disenchantment towards his political agenda. Vice President Humphrey ran on a platform to continue the policies of Johnson's Great Society and support civil rights for African Americans, former Vice President Nixon ran on a law and order platform to combat crime in the nation's cities plus promote new leadership in Vietnam, and Governor Wallace ran a similar law and order campaign with an emphasis on opposition to school desegregation and support for states' rights.

Although Wallace did not poll as heavily in the Midwest as he did in the South, he was able to appeal to blue collar working class voters who traditionally voted Democrat, but had become disillusioned with the race riots and civil rights. As a result, he siphoned off enough votes to allow Nixon to win every state in the region except for Humphrey's home state of Minnesota and Michigan. Even with Michigan being Wallace's second best Midwestern state percentage-wise behind Ohio, Humphrey was able to hold on to the Wolverine State's electoral votes for the Democrats once more, mainly by running up margins in heavily populated Wayne County (Detroit), the surrounding suburban counties of Macomb and Monroe, Genesee County (Flint), and the Upper Peninsula. Nixon would become the first Republican to win the White House without Michigan, the only other one to do so was George W. Bush. Humphrey was the first losing Democrat to carry Michigan since Lewis Cass in 1848. Michigan would not vote Democratic again until 1992.

, this is the last time Wayne County cast more than a million votes.

Results

Results by county

See also
 United States presidential elections in Michigan

Notes

References

Michigan
1968 Michigan elections
1968